Mehgaon Assembly constituency is one of the 230 Vidhan Sabha (Legislative Assembly) constituencies of Madhya Pradesh state in central India. This constituency came into existence in 1951, as Gohad Mehgaon, one of the 79 Vidhan Sabha constituencies of the erstwhile Madhya Bharat state.

Overview
Mehgaon (constituency number 12) is one of the 5 Vidhan Sabha constituencies located in Bhind district. This constituency covers the entire Mehgaon tehsil and part of Raun tehsil.

Mehgaon is part of Bhind Lok Sabha constituency along with seven other Vidhan Sabha constituencies, namely, Ater, Bhind, Lahar and Gohad in this district and Sewda, Bhander and Datia in Datia district.

 1977: Rameshwardayal Dantare, Janata Party
 1980: Rai Singh Bhadoriya, Independent
 1985: Rustam Singh, Indian National Congress
 1990: Hari Singh Narwaria, Indian National Congress
 1993: Naresh Singh Gurjar, Bahujan Samaj Party
 1998: Rakesh Shukla, Bharatiya Janata Party
 2003: Munna Singh Narwaria, Independent
 2008: Rakesh Shukla, Bharatiya Janata Party
 2013: Chaudhary Mukesh Singh Chaturvedi, Bharatiya Janata Party
2018: O. P. S. Bhadoria, Indian National Congress
2020 (by election): O. P. S. Bhadoria, Bharatiya Janata Party

References

Bhind district
Assembly constituencies of Madhya Pradesh